Marquis Mu of Jin, ancestral name Ji (姬), given name Feiwang (費王) or Fusheng (弗生), was the ninth ruler of the state of Jin during the Western Zhou Dynasty. After his father, Marquis Xian of Jin died in 812 BC, he ascended the throne of Jin.

In 808 BC, the fourth year of his reign, he married a woman from the royal family of Qi to be one of his concubines. In 805 BC, the seventh year of his reign, he battled with a tribe called Tiao (條). During this time, his eldest son, Chou, was born.

In 802 BC, after being victorious in the battle with a tribe called Qianmu (千畝), his other son, Chengshi, was born.

Marquis Mu reigned for 27 years.  When he died in 785 BC his younger brother Shang Shu usurped the throne.  Chou was forced to leave Jin.

Monarchs of Jin (Chinese state)
9th-century BC Chinese monarchs
8th-century BC Chinese monarchs
785 BC deaths